The Indianapolis Hoosiers (or, according to some sources, the Indianapolis Blues) were a professional baseball team who played one season at the major league level. Their home games were played at Seventh Street Park in Indianapolis. They were managed first by Jim Gifford, then Bill Watkins.

This team was the first of three Major League Baseball teams to bear the name Indianapolis Hoosiers, although they were unrelated to either the version that played in the National League from 1887 until 1889, or to the Federal League team of 1914.

See also
1884 Indianapolis Hoosiers season

Sources
1884 AA Hoosiers at Baseball Reference

American Association
American Association (1882–1891) baseball teams
Defunct baseball teams in Indiana
Baseball teams disestablished in 1884
Baseball teams established in 1884